Tetragonoderus babaulti is a species of beetle in the family Carabidae. It was described by Alluaud in 1931.

References

babaulti
Beetles described in 1931